Elizabeth Scalia is a British-Italian professional racing cyclist, specializing in marathon mountain bike racing, and was the women's marathon national champion in 2007. She is based in Italy and has represented Great Britain in several international events including World Cups and World Championships.

Achievements
2006
2nd Marathon, British National Mountain Biking Championships
1st Trek Marathon Series, Round 1, Margam Park
2nd Trek Marathon Series, Round 3, Plymouth
12th Marathon, UCI Mountain Bike World Championships

2007
1st  Marathon, British National Mountain Biking Championships
3rd Trek Marathon Series, Round 1, Thetford
4th Trek Marathon Series, Round 2, Sherwood
3rd Trek Marathon Series, Round 3, Margam Park
1st Trek Marathon Series, Round 4, Newnham Park

2008
2nd Marathon, British National Mountain Biking Championships, Margam Park

References

External links
Results on the-sports.org

Year of birth missing (living people)
Living people
British female cyclists
Italian female cyclists
Marathon mountain bikers
Place of birth missing (living people)